Säydäşev Salix Camaletdin ulı (pronounced   Salix Säydäş, also spelled Salikh Saydash(ev)  (Tatar Cyrillic: Сәйдәш(ев) Салих Җамалетдин улы; , Saydashev Salikh Zamaletdinovich; 1900 – December 16, 1954) was a Tatar composer and conductor. People's Artist of Tatar ASSR (1951), Honoured Worker of Culture (1939). Salix Säydäş one of the founding fathers of Tatar professional music.

Säydäşev gave a stimulus to development of different genres in Tatar music, such as opera, ballet, musical comedy, symphonic, choral, popular and pop music. The main part of his creative work was music for musical dramatic plays, such as The Blue Shawl (1926) and On Qandır (1932) by Kärim Tinçurin, The Employer by Taci Ğizzät (1928). In  1922-1948 (off and on) Säydäşev was a chief of musical division and conductor in Kazan-based  Tatar Academic Theatre. At that time Säydäşev also arranged concerts.

The Salix Säydäşev Museum opened in Kazan in 1990. The State Grand Concert Hall of Tatarstan was named after Säydäşev by the Decree of the President of Tatarstan from December 15, 2000. Also, one of the streets in the Vakhitov district in Kazan is named after Säydäşev.

Tatar composers as Renat Enikeev, Almaz Monasypov, Rezeda Akhiyarova, Leonid Lubovsky composed several works dedicated to the founder of Soviet Tatar professional music.

References and notes

Sources 

 

1900 births
1954 deaths
Soviet composers
Soviet male composers
Tatar musicians
Tatar people of the Soviet Union
Musicians from Kazan
20th-century classical musicians
20th-century composers
20th-century Russian male musicians